Cyclopentadecanolide is a natural macrolide lactone and a synthetic musk.

Natural occurrence 
Cyclopentadecanolide occurs in small quantities in angelica root essential oil and is responsible for its musklike odor.

Production 
Cyclopentadecanolide is produced synthetically by ring expansion of cyclotetradecanone. Another synthesis route is the depolymerization of polyesters of 15-hydroxypentadecanoic acid.

Uses 
Cyclopentadecanolide is used as a musklike perfume fixative in fine fragrances and as a flavoring agent. It is a substitute for the extremely expensive animal musk.

References 

Flavors
Lactones
Perfume ingredients